Ascobolus stercorarius is a species of apothecial fungus belonging to the family Ascobolaceae.

This is a European species appearing as yellowish discs, turning brown at maturity, up to 5 mm across on animal dung, especially cow, from spring to autumn.

References

Ascobolus stercorarius at Species Fungorum

Pezizales
Fungi described in 1788
Taxa named by Jean Baptiste François Pierre Bulliard